Friedrich Wilhelm Sievers (3 December 1860 – 11 June 1921) was a German geologist and geographer. He served as professor of geography at the University of Giessen. His field work focussed on South America, and his Allgemeine Länderkunde was for several decades a standard work on world geography.

Biography
Sievers was born into a merchant family in Hamburg. He was educated at Jena, Göttingen, and Leipzig, and was made Privatdozent at Würzburg in 1887 after extensive travels in Venezuela and Colombia. In his education, he broke with his mercantile family's tradition in order to study the emerging academic field of geography. He was one of Ferdinand von Richthofen's first students.

On instructions from the Geological Society of Hamburg made three expeditions to South America to carry out geographical and geological studies on the different regions of the country inspired by the expeditions of Alexander von Humboldt. Sievers  mainly focusing on documenting evidence for a South American ice age.  In 1902, from the chatedra of Geography of the University of Giessen, he made public his opposition to the naval blockade that Germany, England and Italy imposed on Venezuela to force the collection of the foreign debt. In 1909, he established the headwaters of the Marañón, the main source of the Amazon river.

Wilhelm Sievers published the Allgemeine Länderkunde (several editions 1891-1935), which for several decades was the leading international geographical publication covering all continents.

Journeys
 1884-1886: Colombia and Venezuela
 1891-1893: Venezuela
 1909: Peru and Ecuador

Selected works

South America 
 Reise in der Sierra Nevada de Santa Marta, 1887
 Venezuela, 1888
 Die Cordillere von Mérida, nebst Bemerkungen über das Karibische Gebirge, 1888
 Zweite Reise in Venezuela in den Jahren 1892-93, 1896
 Die Quellen des Marañon-Amazonas, 1910
 Reise in Peru und Ekuador, Ausgeführt 1909, 1914

Allgemeine Länderkunde 
 Allgemeine Länderkunde: Erste Ausgabe in fünf Bänden, First edition in five volumes, 1891–95
 Allgemeine Länderkunde: Zweite Ausgabe in sechs Bänden, Second edition in six volumes, 1901–05
 Allgemeine Länderkunde: Kleine Ausgabe in zwei Bänden, Compact edition in two volumes, 1907
 Allgemeine Länderkunde: Dritte Ausgabe in sechs Bänden, Third edition 1914 (Due to the outbreak of World War I, this edition remained incomplete)
 Allgemeine Länderkunde: Begr. von W. Sievers, Third/fourth edition, 1924–35

Other publications 
 Über die Abhängigkeit der jetzigen Konfessionsverteilung in Südwestdeutschland von den früheren Territorialgrenzen (Dissertation), Göttingen 1884. 
 Zur Kenntnis des Taunus, Stuttgart, 1891

References

Literature 
 F. Oliver Brachfield: Sievers en Mérida. De los apuntes de un geógrafo alemán en la Cordillera – 1885,  Mérida 1951. 
 P. Claß: Universitätsprofessor Dr. Wilhelm Sievers †. Ein Nachruf, Geographischer Anzeiger, 23. Jahrg. 1922 Heft 1/2
 C. Schubert: Hermann Karsten (1851) y Wilhelm Sievers (1888): las primeras descripciones e interpretaciones sobre el órigen de las terrazas aluviales en la Córdillera de Mérida. Bol. Hist. Geocien. Venez., 44, pp 15–19

External links
 

1860 births
1921 deaths
Botanists active in South America
Botanists with author abbreviations
Explorers of South America
German explorers
German geographers
19th-century German geologists
19th-century German botanists
Glaciologists
Geopoliticians
Scientists from Hamburg
Academic staff of the University of Giessen
20th-century German geologists